The winners for the 2011 African-American Film Critics Association.

Special Achievement: George Lucas, (Cinema Vanguard); Richard Roundtree, (AAFCA Legacy); Hattie Winston (AAFCA Horizon) and Institution, Sony Pictures Entertainment.

References

2011 film awards
African-American Film Critics Association Awards